The Pearl of the Orient Tower, previously known as Embassy Pointe Tower, is a residential skyscraper located in Manila, Philippines, owned by the Philippine Estates Corporation. The building has 42 floors above ground, wherein 6 floors are for parking spaces, 5 floors for office and commercial purposes, 30 floors for luxury residential units, and 2 floors for penthouse units. There are also 4 basement levels for parking.

Project team

The Pearl of the Orient Tower was designed by American architectural firm Nadel Architects, Inc., in cooperation with local architectural firm G & W Architects. Structural design was provided by Ove Arup & Partners, and was reviewed by Arup in cooperation with local engineering firm F.C. Cebedo & Partners.

Other members of the design team are M.A. Alix & Partners (Fire Protection Works); and NBF Water & Wastewater Services (Now N.B. Franco Consulting Engineers - Sanitary and Plumbing Works).

Project and construction management was handled by Constech Management Group.

Location
The building is located on Roxas Boulevard near Manila Bay and opposite the Embassy of the United States. It is close to the historical centre of Manila, the walled city of Intramuros and other sites including Luneta Park, the Quirino Grandstand and Manila Ocean Park. A few kilometers away are the Cultural Center of the Philippines, Star City theme park, and the Manila Yacht Club.

Features

Among the building's features are 3 high speed elevators for residential floors, 2 high speed elevators for the office and commercial floors, and 1 high speed service elevator for the entire building. The building also has Video Phone Communicating System for residents; Centralized Air Conditioning System at Commercial and Office Areas; 
built-in CATV cable system; telephone lines; emergency power generator, and individual mail boxes. The building also has a helicopter landing pad at the roofdeck.

The building's amenities include the City Club at the 13th floor, which includes a swimming pool and a kiddie pool, game rooms, function rooms, a gym, health spa, business center, and a fine-dining restaurant. The building also has an elegant and spacious lobby lounges.

References

External links 
Pearl of the Orient Tower at Emporis
Pearl of the Orient Tower at Skyscraperpage.com

Residential skyscrapers in Metro Manila
Skyscrapers in Manila
Buildings and structures in Ermita
Residential buildings completed in 2004
Skyscraper office buildings in Metro Manila